Victor Herbert Perrin (April 26, 1916 – July 4, 1989) was an American radio, film, and television actor, perhaps best remembered for providing the "Control Voice" in the original version of the television series The Outer Limits (1963–1965). He was also a radio scriptwriter as well as a narrator in feature films and for special entertainment and educational projects, such as the original Spaceship Earth and Universe of Energy rides at Epcot at the Walt Disney World Resort in Florida.

Early years
Perrin was born in Menomonee Falls, Wisconsin, the elder of two sons of Kathryn (née Mittlesteadt) and Milton A. Perrin, who was a traveling salesman. In 1940, after graduating from the University of Wisconsin–Madison in the late 1930s, Vic moved to California.

Career

Radio 
During the 1940s and 1950s, Perrin was a regular performer on many commercial radio programs. In 1941 he became a staff announcer for NBC, staying there for several years before moving to ABC and becoming chief announcer at the Blue Network. His first credited role came in 1943, when he served as the announcer for "The Last Will and Testament Of Tom Smith", a radio episode of Free World Theatre, which was produced and directed by Arch Oboler. He narrated too "A Star With Two Names", part of the segment "Behind The Scenes Hollywood Story" of The Hollywood Music Hall radio program. At the same time, he joined Charles Laughton's theatrical repertory group.

Perrin was also a regular guest star on the radio version of Gunsmoke, and he wrote or co-wrote five scripts for that popular Western series between 1959 and 1961. Perrin was a series regular as well on the anthology radio drama Family Theatre, played Ross Farnsworth on One Man's Family, and was featured as cavalry trooper Sergeant Gorse in Fort Laramie in 1956. He performed too as several characters in Escape, Pete Kelly's Blues, Dragnet, Yours Truly, Johnny Dollar, and Have Gun – Will Travel. In an uncredited role, he also impersonated Clyde Beatty on The Clyde Beatty Show.

Television 
One of Perrin's first television roles was in "The Golden Vulture", a 1953 episode of the Adventures of Superman. He would go on to appear in 16 installments of Dragnet, as well as the pilot for the 1967 revival of the series. He appeared in episodes of Gunsmoke, Maverick, The Big Valley, and Mission: Impossible. He played characters in a variety of other series, including Peter Gunn, Black Saddle, Have Gun – Will Travel, Mackenzie's Raiders, The Untouchables, Going My Way, Perry Mason, Adam-12, The F.B.I., and Mannix.

Perrin served as the Control Voice, the narrator of The Outer Limits, and provided voices for characters in episodes of Star Trek, as well as appearing in one episode. He also appeared in two episodes of The Twilight Zone. He guest-stars too on "The Guardians", a 1981 episode of Buck Rogers in the 25th Century.

Perrin did extensive voice work in animation. He voiced multiple characters on the Hanna-Barbera animated television series Scooby-Doo, Where Are You! Those characters include, The Ape Man, Carl the Stuntman, Pietro, The Puppet Master, Dr. Najib, The Snow Ghost, Mr. Leech, Yeti, Fu Lan Chi, among others. Perrin was the voices of The Phantom Racer, Junkyard Watchman, Ken Rogers, Anthos and John Thomas on The Scooby-Doo Show. Perrin was also the voices of Mr. McDabble, Mr. Kronos and The Minotaur on The New Scooby and Scrappy-Doo Show. He also provided the voice of Dr. Zin, the main antagonist on Jonny Quest along with voicing Roberts, Search Plane Pilot, Junior, Frogman Leader, Miguel, Kronick, Professor Ericson and others on the series. Perrin  voiced Cyclops on The Marvel Super Heroes. Perrin voiced Creature King and Lurker on Space Ghost. Perrin voiced Mekkor and the Captain of the Sky Pirates on The Herculoids. Perrin voiced Number One, The Ruthless Ringmaster and others on Birdman and the Galaxy Trio. Perrin voiced Red Ghost, Silver Surfer, Professor Gamma and The Demon on Fantastic Four (1967 TV series). Perrin is the voice of Hawkman on Filmations, The Superman/Aquaman Hour of Adventure and Aquaman (TV series). Perrin voiced Sinestro, who is the nemesis of the Green Lantern, along with voicing Dr. Starns, Turkish Engineer, Brain Creature, Professor Reed and Frankenstein's Monster on Challenge of the Superfriends. Perrin voiced Namor and Caesar Cicero on Spider-Man (1981 TV series). Perrin voiced Thor, Zerona's Soldier and Black Knight on Spider-Man and His Amazing Friends. Perrin provided additional voices on The New Fantastic Four, Spider-Woman and The Incredible Hulk (1982 TV series). Perrin voiced Ming the Merciless on the 1982 television film Flash Gordon: The Greatest Adventure of All produced by Filmation. Perrin voiced Teetor on the 1984 animated musical film Gallavants produced by Marvel Productions. In 1986 Perrin reprised his voice role as Dr. Zin on The New Adventures of Jonny Quest. Other Hanna-Barbera shows Perrin has provided additional voices on are the live-action and animated fantasy  television series The New Adventures of Huckleberry Finn as Castway Charlie, Centaur, Doorgah, High Priest, Rabbit and Chief, Help!... It's the Hair Bear Bunch! as Professor Neilsen Rockabuilt, Inch High, Private Eye, These Are the Days, Clue Club, Jabberjaw, Captain Caveman and the Teen Angels as Mummy, Brackish and Professor Pryce, Jana of the Jungle, Super Friends (1980 TV series) as Sailor, The Smurfs and The Greatest Adventure: Stories from the Bible.

Other voice work 
For many years Perrin narrated dozens of science and educational short films for educational filmmaking pioneer Sy Wexler and continued to do voice-overs and to play character roles until a short time before his death.

Perrin was active in off-camera work in television commercials, prompting one newspaper article to include the comment "Vic Perrin is one actor who makes more money when he's not seen on camera than when he is." He was also the original voice narrator for Disney's Epcot Center attraction: Spaceship Earth in Orlando, Florida. Vic Perrin also narrated two movies in the original Epcot Center Universe of Energy pavilion:  "Kinetic Energy" and "Energy Creation Story".

Personal life and death 
He was first married to Evelyn Held on March 10, 1963. Evelyn died in 1972 and they had no children. He married for a second time to Rita Singer in 1977 and had a son, George. He also had a stepson, Steven, from Rita's previous marriage. Perrin and Rita divorced in January 1979, but remarried in September of that year.

Perrin died of cancer at Cedars-Sinai Medical Center in Los Angeles, California, July 4, 1989, aged 73.

Filmography

Television (selected)

References and notes

External links 

 
 
 
 Vic Perrin profile, Aveleyman.com

1916 births
1989 deaths
Male actors from Wisconsin
American male radio actors
American male television actors
American male voice actors
People from Menomonee Falls, Wisconsin
Deaths from cancer in California
Radio and television announcers
Male actors from Los Angeles
20th-century American male actors
University of Wisconsin–Madison alumni
Western (genre) television actors